Bernard Joseph Morrey (6 April 1927 – 23 March 2011) was an English footballer who played as a winger in the Football League for Newport County and Chester in the 1950s.

Morrey was the great-uncle of England international footballer Wayne Rooney.

References

1927 births
2011 deaths
Footballers from Liverpool
Association football wingers
English footballers
Llandudno F.C. players
Newport County A.F.C. players
Chester City F.C. players
Ellesmere Port Town F.C. players
English Football League players